Toofan Aur Bijlee (The Storm and Lightning) is a 1975 Hindi action film produced and directed by Homi Wadia. The music direction was by Chitragupta with lyrics written by Kafil Azar. The film starred Arvind Kumar, Zaheera, Bhagwan, Mohan Choti and Tun Tun.

The story is about twin sisters Madhuri and Sheela, both played by Zaheera, whose parents and younger brother have been killed by villains. The story follows Madhuri’s revenge against them, aided by a young man called Azad.

Plot
Detective Rana is after the bad guys Jugal, Zulfi and Laloo. However, they murder him along with his wife and son. Out of his two daughters, Madhuri escapes and is saved by a circus man Zorawar. She has promised her mother to avenge her family's death before running away from the villains. The other daughter Sheela, Madhuri’s look-alike, is kidnapped by the crooks and grows up to be a night club dancer, having lost her memory. Madhuri, with the help of her friends and her dog Tiger, finds the night club. She takes Sheela’s place. Azad, a young man whom Madhuri meets and falls in love with helps her fight the gangsters. Sheela also recovers her memory and falls in love with Azad. Finally, there is a chase scene with fights on top of trains and a shootout in which Sheela is killed. Azad turns out to be a police detective and Madhuri and he get together.

Cast
 Zaheera
 Mohan Choti
 Tun Tun
 Bhagwan
 Arvind Kumar
 Imtiaz
 Randhawa
 Habib
 Babu Raje

Music
The film’s music was composed by Chitragupta with lyrics by Kafil Azar. The singing artists were Mohammed Rafi, Mahendra Kapoor, Asha Bhosle & Ranu Mukherjee.

Songlist

References

External links

1975 films
1970s Hindi-language films
Films directed by Homi Wadia
Films scored by Chitragupta
1970s action adventure films
Indian action adventure films